Grave visiting or visiting of graves may mean:-
 Pilgrimage – in religious contexts
 Tombstone tourist – usually a secular activity
 Tomb sweeping or grave tending in various cultures
 Ziarah – in Islam – noting it is visitation – not pilgrimage

See also
 All Souls' Day
 Festival of the Dead
 Veneration of the dead